The TVR 450 SEAC is a sports car designed and built by TVR in a one-year only run. It used the same body style as the 420 SEAC  but was fibreglass compared with the Aramid Composite (Glassfibre and Kevlar) body of the 420 and the same chassis. As a consequence though the 450 SEAC was even more expensive to build and buy than the already expensive 420 SEAC, so about 17 were made. Curiously, rumour has it that more SEAC's are on the road now than were manufactured in the first place, that is because many wedges were converted to 450 SEAC spec afterwards.

Specifications 

Engine

Engine: TVR Power Rover V8
Engine capacity: 4441 cc (4.4L)
Power Output: 
Torque Output: 

Transmission
Transmission: five speed gearbox (Borg Warner T5)

Chassis/Body
Chassis: Tubular spaceframe
Body: Fibreglass reinforced with kevlar one piece body

Performance
Acceleration 0- : 4,5 seconds
Top speed:

External links 
 the SEAC pages

450 SEAC
Sports cars
Rear-wheel-drive vehicles
Cars introduced in 1988
Cars discontinued in 1989